Navy Island  was a small island situated within the Inner Harbour of Saint John, New Brunswick in Canada. For centuries, Navy Island existed as a narrow, oval shaped hunk of rock sitting roughly at the turning point of the harbour where the deep open water ends and the harbour approaches the Reversing Falls. However, the island ceased to exist in its traditional form when the construction of the Saint John Harbour Bridge linked the island to the mainland in the 1970s. The island now sits under the western footing of the bridge, and is survived in name by the Navy Island Forest Products Terminal, operated by the Port of Saint John.
When Samuel de Champlain visited Saint John in 1604, the island was the location of a native Maliseet settlement named Ouigoudi.

See also 
 Saint John, New Brunswick
List of communities in New Brunswick
List of islands of New Brunswick

Coastal islands of New Brunswick
Landforms of Saint John County, New Brunswick
Former islands of Canada